Ice cutting is a winter task of collecting surface ice from lakes and rivers for storage in ice houses and use or sale as a cooling method. Rare today, it was common (see ice trade) before the era of widespread mechanical refrigeration and air conditioning technology. The work was done as a winter chore by many farmers and as a winter occupation by icemen. Kept insulated, the ice was preserved for cold food storage during warm weather, either on the farm or for delivery to residential and commercial customers with ice boxes. A large ice trade existed in the 19th and early 20th centuries, until mechanical refrigeration displaced it.

Ice harvesting generally involved waiting until approximately a foot of ice had built up on the water surface in the winter. The ice would then be cut with either a handsaw or a powered saw blade into long continuous strips and then cut into large individual blocks for transport by wagon back to the ice house. Because snow on top of the ice slows freezing, it could be scraped off and piled in windrows. Alternatively, if the temperature is cold enough, a snowy surface could be flooded to produce a thicker layer of ice.  A large operation would have a crew of 75 and cut 1500 tons daily.

Ice cutting was a considerable export industry for northern countries in Scandinavia and North America during the 19th century. It started in the United States around 1800, and spread to Scandinavia around 1820, by which Norway by the mid century became a major exporter to England, Europe, the Mediterranean, and as far away as Kingdom of Kongo, Egypt and New York. Coastal Telemark had 1,300 workers exporting 125,000 tons in 1895-96, while the Oslo Fjord was the main European export region with Nesodden municipality alone employing 1,000 men and exporting 95,000 tons in 1900, at a time when Norway's combined ice export at 500,000 tons stood as the world's largest.

However, domestic production and sales were the largest single market source for ice in America and Europe. From the 1850s onwards ice cutting took on large-scale industrial proportions in Germany with Berlin as a key market. In the 1880s, New York City had over 1500 ice delivery wagons and Americans consumed over 5 million tons of ice annually.

Ice cutting is still in use today for ice and snow sculpture events. A swing saw is used to get ice out of a river for the Harbin International Ice and Snow Sculpture Festival each year. A swing saw is also used to cut ice out from the frozen surface of the Songhua River, China. Many ice sculptures are made from the ice harvested this way. In some countries at high latitudes, even ice hotels and ice palaces are made.

See also
 Ice trade
 Frederic Tudor
 Nathaniel Jarvis Wyeth

References

External links

 The Ice Industry, from 1795-1895. One hundred years of American commerce, edited by Chauncey Mitchell Depew
  Maine Ice Industry, an annual report of the Bureau of Industrial and Labor Statistics for the State, by the Maine Bureau of Industrial and Labor Statistics
The Ice Crop: How to Harvest, Store, Ship and Use Ice (1893) in the Science History Institute Digital Collections
Use Your Car for Ice-Cutting This Winter, Popular Science monthly, February 1919, page 34.
KK.org Amish Homebuilt gas powered ice cutter to make ice for non-electric icebox
blueflower.tripod.com Homebuilt gas powered ice cutter
HMdb.org THE HISTORICAL MARKER DATABASE, Ice Harvesting
winnipeg.ctv.ca Modern ice cutter in Manitoba.
pudsandlosers.blogspot.com, Ice Palace 2 - Cutting Ice, Saturday, January 31, 2009

Obsolete occupations
Water ice
Ice trade
Articles containing video clips